The Machmell River, also spelled Machmel River, is a river in the Pacific Ranges of the southern Coast Mountains in British Columbia, Canada. It flows west into Owikeno Lake.

References

Rivers of the Central Coast of British Columbia
Rivers of the Pacific Ranges